Irving Berry (born 11 January 1986) is a Panamanian professional boxer and is the second ranked featherweight for the WBA championship.

Professional career

On 4 December 2010, Berry lost first title shot to WBA featherweight champion, Jonathan Victor Barros.

References

External links

Featherweight boxers
1986 births
Living people
Sportspeople from Panama City
Panamanian male boxers